Victor Vadimovich Batyrev (Виктор Вадимович Батырев, born 31 August 1961, Moscow) is a Russian mathematician, specializing in algebraic and arithmetic geometry and its applications to mathematical physics. He is a professor at the University of Tübingen.

Biography 
Batyrev studied mathematics from 1978 to 1985 at Moscow State University. From 1991 he was at the University of Essen, where he earned his habilitation in 1993. Since 1996 he has been a professor at the University of Tübingen.

He received in 1994 the Gottschalk-Diederich-Baedeker Prize. In 1995 he received the Heinz Maier-Leibnitz Prize for his habilitation thesis Hodge Theory of Hypersurfaces in Toric Varieties and Recent Developments in Quantum Physics. In 1998 he was an invited speaker at the International Congress of Mathematicians in Berlin and gave a talk Mirror Symmetry and Toric Geometry. In 2003 he was elected a member of the Heidelberger Akademie der Wissenschaften.

Selected publications

References

External links 
mathnet.ru

1961 births
Living people
Algebraic geometers
Russian string theorists
20th-century Russian mathematicians
21st-century Russian mathematicians
Moscow State University alumni
Academic staff of the University of Tübingen
Soviet mathematicians